The Netherlands competed at the 2022 Winter Olympics in Beijing, China, from 4 to 20 February 2022.

The Netherlands won eight gold medals at these Games, matching their gold medal hauls from 2014 and 2018, although the total number of medals won decreased from 24 in 2014 to 20 in 2018 and 17 in 2022.

Speed skater Irene Schouten was the flagbearer during the closing ceremony.

Medalists

The following Dutch competitors won medals at the games. In the discipline sections below, the medalists' names are bolded.

| width="78%" align="left" valign="top" |

| width="22%" align="left" valign="top" |

Competitors
The following is the list of number of competitors participating at the Games per sport/discipline.

Alpine skiing

By meeting the basic qualification standards The Netherlands qualified one male and one female alpine skier.

Bobsleigh 

The Netherlands qualified three sleds (two-man, four-man and women's monobob) over the course of the 2021–22 Bobsleigh World Cup.

Figure skating

In the 2021 World Figure Skating Championships in Stockholm, Sweden, the Netherlands secured one quota in the ladies singles competition.

Short track speed skating 

The Netherlands qualified all three relays and the maximum of five athletes in each gender.

Men

Women

Mixed

Key: AA = Advanced to medal round due to being impeded by another skater; DNF = Did not finish; FA = Qualified to medal round; FB = Qualified to consolation round; PEN = Penalty; Q = Qualified to next round

Skeleton

The Netherlands qualified one female skeleton racer over the course of the 2021–22 Skeleton World Cup.

Snowboarding

The Netherlands have qualified for 4 quota places (2 men, 2 women) racer over the course of the 2021–22 Snowboard World Cup.

Freestyle

Parallel

Snowboard cross

Speed skating

The Dutch Olympic Committee selected the maximum allowed delegation of nine men and nine women, largely based on the results of the Olympic qualification tournament, held in December 2021.

Men

Women

Mass start

Team pursuit

Key: FA = Qualified to gold medal round; FB = Qualified to bronze medal round; L = Lost; OR = Olympic record; Q = Qualified to next round; W = Won

References

Nations at the 2022 Winter Olympics
2022
Winter Olympics